Psalm 97 is the 97th psalm of the Book of Psalms, beginning in the English of the King James Version: "The Lord reigneth; let the earth rejoice", also as "The Lord is King". The Book of Psalms is part of the third section of the Hebrew Bible, and a book of the Christian Old Testament. In Latin, it is known as "Dominus regnavit exultet terra". The psalm is a hymn psalm; the Jerusalem Bible calls it an "eschatological hymn".

In the slightly different numbering system in the Greek Septuagint version of the bible and in the Latin Vulgate, this psalm is Psalm 96.

The psalm forms a regular part of Jewish, Catholic, Lutheran, Anglican and other Protestant liturgies. It has often been set to music, notably  by Otto Nicolai as a German motet, and by Antonín Dvořák, who set it in Czech in his Biblical Songs.

Text

Hebrew Bible version
Following is the Hebrew text of Psalm 97:

King James Version 
 The Lord reigneth; let the earth rejoice; let the multitude of isles be glad thereof.
 Clouds and darkness are round about him: righteousness and judgment are the habitation of his throne.
 A fire goeth before him, and burneth up his enemies round about.
 His lightnings enlightened the world: the earth saw, and trembled.
 The hills melted like wax at the presence of the Lord, at the presence of the Lord of the whole earth.
 The heavens declare his righteousness, and all the people see his glory.
 Confounded be all they that serve graven images, that boast themselves of idols: worship him, all ye gods.
 Zion heard, and was glad; and the daughters of Judah rejoiced because of thy judgments, O Lord.
 For thou, LORD, art high above all the earth: thou art exalted far above all gods.
 Ye that love the LORD, hate evil: he preserveth the souls of his saints; he delivereth them out of the hand of the wicked.
 Light is sown for the righteous, and gladness for the upright in heart.
 Rejoice in the Lord, ye righteous; and give thanks at the remembrance of his holiness.

Textual witnesses
Some early manuscripts containing the text of this chapter in Hebrew are of the Masoretic Text tradition, which includes the Aleppo Codex (10th century), and Codex Leningradensis (1008).

The extant palimpsest Aq includes a translation into Koine Greek by Aquila of Sinope in c. 130 CE, containing verses 1–12.

Themes
Psalm 97 foreshadows the messianic era when God will reign supreme over the earth. Its verses reference God's sovereignty, his enactment of justice, and the widespread rejoicing that will ensue.

Verse 8
Zion hears and is glad,And the daughters of Judah rejoice.Zion is Jerusalem; the "daughters of Judah" are the other towns in Judah.

Uses
Judaism
Psalm 97 is the third of six psalms recited during the Kabbalat Shabbat (Welcoming the Shabbat) service in Ashkenazic, Hasidic and some Sephardic communities.. These six psalms represent the six days of the week, with Psalm 97 corresponding to the third day (Tuesday).

Verse 11 of the psalm, "Light is sown for the righteous...", is recited by Eastern Ashkenazi Jews at the start of the Kol Nidre service on Yom Kippur.

Verse 11 is also one of the verses which the Shulchan Aruch (Code of Jewish Law) advises a person to say if he is having trouble falling asleep.

New Testament
In the Letter to the Hebrews in the New Testament,  relates a number of scriptural proofs that "the Son is greater than the angels", including at verse 6, And let all the angels of God worship him. The Masoretic text version of Psalm 97:7 reads worship him, all ye gods but the Septuagint equivalent reads "προσκυνήσατε αὐτῷ πάντες οἱ ἄγγελοι αὐτοῦ", worship him, all ye his angels.

Musical settings
Heinrich Schütz set the psalm in German as part of his setting of the Becker Psalter, which he published in 1628. Titled "Der Herr ist König überall" (The lord is King everywhere), it is catalogued as SWV 195. Henry Desmarest composed one grand motet "Dominus regnant" (unknown date). Jean-Joseph Cassanéa de Mondonville composed one grand motet "Dominus regnavit" in 1734. Friedrich Ludwig Benda set the psalm in German as a cantata for three soloists, choir and orchestra in 1786. Otto Nicolai set Psalm 97 in German as a psalm motet for choir a cappella with solo passages, "Der Herr ist König" (The Lord is King) in 1832, published by Bote & Bock in Berlin in 1977. Antonín Dvořák set verses 2–6 in Czech to music in No. 1 of his Biblical Songs, Op. 99, in 1894.

Works for Anglican services include a setting by Joseph Barnby, The Lord is King''.

References

Cited sources

Further reading

External links

 
 Ps.97: Adonai Malach Tagel Ha-aretz  יי מלך תגל הארץ Recording of the last five verses of the Psalm as sung in Kabbalat Shabbat]
 Psalms Chapter 97 text in Hebrew and English, mechon-mamre.org
 The Lord is king; let the earth rejoice text and footnotes, usccb.org United States Conference of Catholic Bishops
 Psalm 97:1 introduction and text, biblestudytools.com
 Psalm 97 enduringword.com
 Hymns for Psalm 97 hymnary.org

097